Audi Sport GmbH, formerly known as quattro GmbH, is the high-performance car manufacturing subsidiary of Audi, a subsidiary of the Volkswagen Group.

Founded in October 1983 as quattro GmbH, it primarily specialises in producing high performance Audi cars and components, along with purchaser specified customisations. The company's former name was an homage to Audi's original four-wheel drive rally-inspired road car—the Audi Quattro. In 2016, the company was renamed Audi Sport GmbH.

It is located in a  site at Neckarsulm, near Stuttgart, in the German State of Baden-Württemberg. Development and manufacturing factories are based within a larger  site of the now defunct German automotive maker (and Wankel pistonless rotary engine pioneer) NSU Motorenwerke AG 

Its core products include the Audi RS4, the Audi RS6 and the Audi R8. Furthermore, it is a 'closed company', in that it does not sell its automobiles directly to the public via franchised outlets under its own brand name; instead, they are sold under the Audi marque. However, it does now sell 'quattro GmbH' branded lifestyle products and accessories via Audi franchised outlets and Audi Forum such as that located in the Allianz Arena on the northern outskirts of Munich, Germany.

Business areas
Audi Sport GmbH specialises in four 'key' areas, including the design, testing and production of specialist and high performance Audi automobiles, such as the Audi RS3, Audi RS4, Audi RS5, Audi RS6, Audi RS7, Audi RS Q3, Audi RS Q8, Audi TTRS and the Audi R8.

They also design and specify roadwheels, and design and produce sports suspension, and the specialist car body parts (such as front bumpers and splitters, side skirts, rear bumpers and diffusers, and rear spoilers) which are mainly used on the Audi "S line" trim specification available on most of the model range.

RS cars

The Audi RS cars have technology and performance comparable with high performance sports cars such as the Porsche 911. Being based on conventional saloon (sedan) or estate (station wagon) cars, RS models also retain the everyday comfort and practicality of regular mainstream models. They are some of the most powerful vehicles ever offered by Audi. quattro GmbH create, design, develop and produce all RS models in conjunction with parent, AUDI AG.

The "RS" initials are taken from the  – literally translated as "racing sport". RS is Audi's highest trim level, positioned above the "S" ("Sport") specification level of Audi's regular model range. RS cars are usually produced in limited numbers over a limited time scale (historically, nearing the end of the production run of a certain model, before a new evolution or generation of the same model), and pioneer some of Audi's latest and most advanced technology and engineering prowess; therefore, "RS" cars could be described as (and are often marketed via television advertising as) "halo vehicles". Whilst RS cars generally command a much higher purchase price, compared to their 'lesser' brethren, they also retain very high residual values too.

S line

S line is a trim specification that is offered on many Audi models. Whilst the individual S line parts and components are designed and manufactured by quattro GmbH, Audi "S line" cars are still manufactured in the same AUDI AG factories, on the same production lines as their related models with differing trim levels. Cars with "S line" trim should not be confused with high performance "S" and "RS" models. Audi cars with S line trim bear identical performance figures to their counterparts with SE or base trim levels, with the exception of the Audi Q7 S line with the 3.0 V6 TFSI petrol engines ( for standard,  for S line).

Audi exclusive
quattro GmbH offers potential purchasers of new Audi cars the possibility of customising their new car beyond the scope of "conventional" options, to their own personal desires during the initial manufacturing process. This facility is called Audi exclusive, and extends to virtually all areas of the car. The customer may choose unique exterior paint, in any colour, as well as alloy wheels originally developed by quattro GmbH. For the interior, the upholstery can be finished in various grades and grains of leathers (including Nappa), in a choice of colours. These coloured leathers may also be applied to interior door coverings and rear parcel shelves. Headlining fabrics can be customised in colour, along with seat belt webbing. The interior can be finished with a wide selection of wooden trims, sourced from around the world, along with colour coordinated piping on the edges of tailored floor carpet mats. A range of in-car office equipment is also available. quattro GmbH first offered this service at the 1995 Frankfurt International Motor Show.

Audi lifestyle / Audi Accessories
From 1985, quattro GmbH have developed a range of Audi lifestyle products, known as Audi Accessories. These include mountain bikes and personal leather goods, such as briefcases, handbags, purses and wallets.

Car production

quattro GmbH has historically only been able to produce one specific model at a time at its sole plant at Neckarsulm. Chronologically, the first quattro GmbH model produced was the Audi RS2 Avant, a joint venture between Porsche and quattro GmbH, from 1994–1996 (and actually built at Porsche's Zuffenhausen plant). After this initial joint venture, all subsequent cars have been solely (with the exception of the Audi TT RS) produced at Neckarsulm by quattro GmbH. The second car was the C4 S6 Plus, produced from April 1996 to July 1997. Third was the 2000–2001 B5 RS4 Avant quattro; fourth was the 2003 C5 RS6 quattro; fifth was the 2005 B7 A4 DTM Edition saloon.

In 2005, they built an Audi TT quattro sport with 176 kW.

The Audi R8 is built in a new and totally separate quattro GmbH plant at Neckarsulm.

The latest Audi TT RS and the Audi RS3 are both notable departures from this Neckarsulm-only production tradition. Whilst the TT RS and RS3 were wholly designed, developed and engineered at Neckarsulm by quattro GmbH, they are manufactured alongside the non RS Audi models, with the TT RS being manufactured at Győr, Hungary, by AUDI AG subsidiary Audi Hungaria Motor Kft.

quattro GmbH-produced cars from Neckarsulm can be identified by their specific 2nd and 3rd digit of the World Manufacturer Identifier section of the vehicles' Vehicle Identification Number (VIN) – quattro GmbH manufactured cars begin with 'WUA....', whereas cars produced by AUDI AG in Germany begin with 'WAU....'.

Audi R8

The Audi R8 two-seat mid-engined sports car was exclusively designed and developed and is produced by quattro GmbH. An old factory on the Audi Neckarsulm site was redeveloped, and €28millon was invested in the new R8 production line. Around 250 employees work on this car.

A subsequent V10 engined version of the R8 is also available, using a de-tuned version of their sister company's 5.2-litre FSI V10, used in the Lamborghini Gallardo LP560-4.

Furthermore, quattro GmbH unveiled a diesel engined R8 concept, the "R8 V12 TDI" (later renamed "R8 TDI Le Mans"). This was to use a 6.0-litre V12 engine, utilising Volkswagen Group's long-established Turbocharged Direct Injection (TDI) turbodiesel technology.

Audi Q7 V12 TDI quattro

quattro GmbH has developed the most powerful diesel powered sport utility vehicle (SUV) in its class. The Audi Q7 V12 TDI quattro is fitted with a V12 Turbocharged Direct Injection (TDI) internal combustion engine.

See also
Audi A8 W12
Audi Sport WRC results
Ehra-Lessien – site of the Volkswagen Group proving ground
Abt Sportsline, an independent tuning and motor racing company, specialising in Audi and other Volkswagen Group products
PPI Automotive Design, an independent tuning company specialising in Audi vehicles
List of German cars

References

Companies based in Baden-Württemberg
Companies based in Neckarsulm
Sport
Volkswagen Group factories
Official motorsports and performance division of automakers
Heilbronn (district)
Audi in motorsport